The 1890–91 Northern Football League season was the second in the history of the Northern Football League, a football competition in Northern England.

Clubs

The league featured 6 clubs which competed in the last season, along with two new clubs:
 Middlesbrough Ironopolis
 Sunderland Albion

League table

References

1890-91
3